Kingfisher Shores is a suburb of the Central Coast region of New South Wales, Australia. It is part of the  local government area.

The suburb was part of Chain Valley Bay, and was approved as a separate suburb on 11 May 2007.

As of 2021, the neighbourhood has had a community garden installed as a courtesy from the power company "Morgan Ash Flyash Depot".

References

Suburbs of the Central Coast (New South Wales)